{{Infobox television
| alt_name    = Geraldo Rivera Reports
| image       = geraldoatlarge.png
| caption     = Logo used 2009–2011
| genre       = Newsmagazine
| creator     = Geraldo Rivera
| presenter   = Geraldo Rivera
| starring    = Laurie Dhue (2007–2008)  Laura Ingle  Phil Keating  Arthel Neville
| country     = United States
| language    = English
| location    = New York City
| camera      = Multi-camera
| runtime     = 60 minutes
| distributor  = 20th Television (2005-2007)
| network     = Syndicated; Fox News Channel
| first_aired = 
| last_aired  = 
| preceded_by = A Current AffairAt Large with Geraldo Rivera
| followed_by = The Greg Gutfeld Show}}Geraldo Rivera Reports, also known as Geraldo at Large, is an American television newsmagazine hosted by Fox News correspondent-at-large and former talk show host Geraldo Rivera.

History

Debuting in national syndication on October 31, 2005, as a replacement for A Current Affair, the show had been on Fox News Channel in a slightly different format since July 6, 2002 as the program, At Large with Geraldo Rivera.

Rivera emphasized that the show would be about "people." The program was seen by Rivera as a test for a potential evening newscast produced by the Fox News Channel. The program aired in the time slot normally designated for national news programs in many markets. However, the program was more similar to the show that it replaced, A Current Affair, in its focus on tabloid-type stories.

Anchors and correspondents from Fox News, including anchor Laurie Dhue, Laura Ingle, Phil Keating, and Arthel Neville, served as correspondents of the newsmagazine.

On October 3, 2009, Geraldo at Large began broadcasting in 720p HD and debuted a whole new on-air look, which included a new program logo and new graphics.

In January 2014, the show went on hiatus but returned on March 8, 2014, as Geraldo Rivera Reports. It aired occasionally until The Greg Gutfeld Show replaced it in 2015.

End of syndication
On January 4, 2007, it was announced that the syndicated program would be canceled due to a "soft ad marketplace, the lack of an early news lead-in for his show in several cities and the timeline for financial success." The program's final syndicated episode aired on January 26, 2007.

Return to Fox News Channel
The show returned to the Fox News Channel weekends on February 10, 2007.Press Release about Geraldo at Large moving back to FOX news channel While the show has not been officially cancelled, it was replaced by The Greg Gutfeld Show'' in 2015, which took over its 10 PM time slot.

Anchors and correspondents

 Laurie Dhue (2007–2008)
 Kimberly Guilfoyle
 Laura Ingle
 Phil Keating
 Arthel Neville
 Craig Rivera

References

External links 
 

2005 American television series debuts
2014 American television series endings
2000s American television news shows
2010s American television news shows
English-language television shows
First-run syndicated television programs in the United States
Fox News original programming